The 2012–13 season was Sloboda Užice's 3rd consecutive season in the Serbian SuperLiga. Pre-season started on 9 July 2012.
Sloboda kicked off the season at home against Spartak ZV on 11 August. The first away game was against BSK Borča on 18 August.

Transfers

In

Out

Fixtures

Round

Results and positions by round

Serbian SuperLiga

Pld = Matches played; W = Matches won; D = Matches drawn; L = Matches lost; GF = Goals for; GA = Goals against; GD = Goal difference; Pts = Points

Serbian Cup

Round

Squad statistics

References

External links
Serbian SuperLiga official website

FK Sloboda Užice
Sloboda Uzice